Mount Pleasant is a village in County Durham, in England. It is situated immediately to the north-east of Spennymoor, close to Tudhoe.

References

Villages in County Durham